Julien Ponceau (born 28 November 2000) is a professional footballer who plays as a midfielder for Ligue 1 club Lorient. Born in Angola, Ponceau is a youth international for France.

Club career

Lorient 
Ponceau is a product of Lorient's youth academy, having joined in 2015. On 14 February 2018, Ponceau signed his first professional contract with Lorient, keeping him at the club until 2020. He made his professional debut in a 1–0 Coupe de la Ligue win over Valenciennes on 14 August 2018.

Loan to Rodez 
On 5 October 2020, Ponceau extended his contract with Lorient until 2023, and signed for Rodez on loan until the end of the 2020–21 season.

Loan to Nîmes
In July 2021, Ponceau moved on a new loan to Nîmes.

Personal life
Ponceau was born in Angola to a French father and Angolan mother, and moved to France at a young age.

Honours 
Lorient

 Ligue 2: 2019–20

References

External links

2000 births
Living people
People from Benguela Province
Sportspeople from Finistère
French footballers
France youth international footballers
Angolan footballers
French people of Angolan descent
Angolan people of French descent
Association football midfielders
Ligue 2 players
FC Lorient players
Rodez AF players
Nîmes Olympique players
Footballers from Brittany